Vitor Coutinho Flora, known as Vitor Flora (born 21 February 1990 São Joaquim da Barra) is a Brazilian footballer, who plays as a striker and attacking midfielder for Araguaia Atlético Clube.

Career
In 2008, he moved to Liverpool Reserves. In 2010, he moved to Goiás. In 2011 he moved back to his first club Botafogo SP. In 2014 Flora signed for FK Daugava Rīga and on  9 August 2014 he scored both goals for the club in a 2-1 victory over FK Liepāja. On 7 December 2016, he signed for Sete de Dourados. In March 2019, he signed for Araguaia Atlético Clube.

Career statistics
(Sort of correct )

References

External links
 ogol
 soccerway

1990 births
Living people
Brazilian footballers
Botafogo Futebol Clube (SP) players
Goiás Esporte Clube players
FK Daugava (2003) players
Brazilian expatriate footballers
Expatriate footballers in Latvia
Brazilian expatriate sportspeople in Latvia
Rio Branco Esporte Clube players
Association football forwards
Association football midfielders
People from São Joaquim da Barra